Kenny Cameron (born 15 July 1943) is a Scottish former footballer who played as striker for a number of Scottish clubs.

Career
Cameron began his senior career with Dundee, for whom he scored in the 1964 Scottish Cup Final. He joined Kilmarnock and then, in 1968, Dundee United, where he managed more than a goal every two games during his six years at Tannadice, leaving in 1974 to join Montrose, whom he later managed. In 1978 Cameron managed Dundee University in the Scottish University Championships and Dundee amateur leagues. Cameron returned to Tannadice as coach, then chief scout, until leaving in 1996 (after fifteen years) to become full-time manager of junior club Dundee St Joseph's. He returned to first club Dundee to join the coaching staff at Dens Park in 1997.

Honours
 Scottish Cup  Runner-up
 1963–64

References 

1943 births
Association football forwards
Dundee F.C. players
Dundee United F.C. players
Kilmarnock F.C. players
Living people
Montrose F.C. managers
Montrose F.C. players
Scottish Football League managers
Scottish Football League players
Scottish football managers
Scottish footballers
Footballers from Dundee
Dundee United F.C. non-playing staff
Scottish league football top scorers
Scottish Junior Football Association players